This is a list of high schools in the state of Ohio.

Allen County
Allen East High School, Layfatte
Bath High School, Lima
Bluffton High School, Bluffton
Elida High School, Elida
Jefferson High School, Delphos
Lima Central Catholic High School, Lima
Lima Senior High School, Lima
Perry High School, Lima
St. John's High School, Delphos
Shawnee High School, Lima
Spencerville High School, Spencerville
Temple Christian School, Lima

Ashland County
Ashland High School, Ashland
Black River High School, Sullivan
Hillsdale High School, Jeromesville
Loudonville High School, Loudonville
Mapleton High School, Ashland

Ashtabula County
Conneaut High School, Conneaut
Edgewood Senior High School, Ashtabula
Geneva High School, Geneva
Grand River Academy, Austinburg
Grand Valley High School, Orwell
Jefferson Area High School, Jefferson
Lakeside High School, Ashtabula
Pymatuning Valley High School, Andover
Saint John School, Ashtabula

Athens County
Alexander High School, Albany
Athens High School, The Plains
Federal Hocking High School, Stewart
Nelsonville-York High School, Nelsonville
Trimble High School, Glouster

Auglaize County
Memorial High School, St. Marys
Minster High School, Minster
New Bremen High School, New Bremen
New Knoxville High School, New Knoxville
Wapakoneta High School, Wapakoneta
Waynesfield-Goshen High School, Waynesfield

Belmont County
Barnesville High School, Barnesville
Bellaire High School, Bellaire
Bridgeport High School, Bridgeport
East Richland Christian Schools, St. Clairsville
Martins Ferry High School, Martins Ferry
Olney Friends School, Barnesville
St. Clairsville High School, St. Clairsville
St. John Central High School, Bellaire
Shadyside High School, Shadyside
Union Local High School, Belmont

Brown County
Eastern High School, Sardinia
Fayetteville-Perry High School, Fayetteville
Georgetown High School, Georgetown
Ripley-Union-Lewis-Huntington High School, Ripley
Western Brown High School, Mount Orab

Butler County
Father Stephen T. Badin High School, Hamilton
Cincinnati Christian Schools, Fairfield
Edgewood High School, Trenton
Fairfield High School, Fairfield
Hamilton High School, Hamilton
Lakota East High School, Liberty Township
Lakota West High School, West Chester
LifeSkills Center of Middletown, Middletown
Madison Junior/Senior High School, Middletown
Middletown High School, Middletown
Monroe Senior High School, Monroe
New Miami High School, Hamilton
Ross High School, Hamilton
Talawanda High School, Oxford

Carroll County
Carrollton High School, Carrollton
Malvern High School, Malvern
Carroll County Christian Acad.

Champaign County
Graham High School, St. Paris
Mechanicsburg High School, Mechanicsburg
Triad High School, North Lewisburg
Urbana High School, Urbana
West Liberty-Salem High School, West Liberty

Clark County
Catholic Central High School, Springfield
Emmanuel Christian Academy, Springfield
Greenon High School, Springfield
Kenton Ridge High School, Springfield
Northeastern High School, Springfield
Northwestern High School, Springfield
Shawnee High School, Springfield
Southeastern Local High School, South Charleston
Springfield High School, Springfield
Tecumseh High School, New Carlisle

Clermont County
Batavia High School, Batavia
Bethel-Tate High School, Bethel
Clermont Northeastern High School, Owensville
Felicity-Franklin High School, Felicity
Goshen High School, Goshen
Milford High School, Milford
New Richmond High School, New Richmond
West Clermont High School, Batavia
Williamsburg High School, Williamsburg

Clinton County
Blanchester High School, Blanchester
Clinton-Massie High School, Clarksville
East Clinton High School, Sabina
Wilmington High School, Wilmington

Columbiana County
Beaver Local High School, East Liverpool
Columbiana High School, Columbiana
Crestview High School, Columbiana
David Anderson Junior/Senior High School, Lisbon
East Liverpool High School, East Liverpool
East Palestine High School, East Palestine
Heartland Christian School, Columbiana
Leetonia High School, Leetonia
Salem High School, Salem
Southern Local Junior/Senior High School, Salineville
United High School, Hanoverton
Wellsville High School, Wellsville

Coshocton County
Coshocton County Career Center, Coshocton
Coshocton High School, Coshocton
Ridgewood High School, West Lafayette
River View High School, Warsaw

Crawford County
Buckeye Central High School, New Washington
Bucyrus High School, Bucyrus
Colonel Crawford High School, North Robinson
Crestline High School, Crestline
Galion High School, Galion
Wynford High School, Bucyrus

Cuyahoga County
Bay High School, Bay Village
Beachwood High School, Beachwood
Beatrice Stone Yavne High School, Beachwood
Beaumont School, Cleveland Heights
Bedford High School, Bedford
Benedictine High School, Cleveland
Berea-Midpark High School, Berea
Brecksville-Broadview Heights High School, Broadview Heights
Brooklyn High School, Brooklyn
Chagrin Falls High School, Chagrin Falls
Charles F. Brush High School, Lyndhurst
Cleveland Central Catholic High School, Cleveland
Cleveland Heights High School, Cleveland Heights
Cleveland School of the Arts, Cleveland
Collinwood High School, Cleveland
Cuyahoga Heights High School, Cuyahoga Heights
East High School, Cleveland
East Technical High School, Cleveland
Eleanor Gerson School, Cleveland
Euclid High School, Euclid
Fairview High School, Fairview Park
Fuchs Mizrachi School, Beachwood
Garfield Heights High School, Garfield Heights
Gilmour Academy, Gates Mills
Glenville High School, Cleveland
Hathaway Brown School, Shaker Heights
Holy Name High School, Parma Heights
Horizon Science Academy, Cleveland (main headquarters)
Independence High School, Independence
Jane Addams Business Careers Center, Cleveland
John Adams High School, Cleveland
John F. Kennedy High School, Cleveland
John Hay High School, Cleveland
John Marshall High School, Cleveland
Lakewood High School, Lakewood
Laurel School, Shaker Heights
Lincoln-West High School, Cleveland
Luther E. Ball High School, Highland Hills
Lutheran High School East, Cleveland Heights
Lutheran High School West, Rocky River
Magnificat High School, Rocky River
Maple Heights High School, Maple Heights
Martin Luther King, Jr. High School, Cleveland
Max S. Hayes High School, Cleveland
Mayfield High School, Mayfield
Montessori High School at University Circle, Cleveland
Mosdos Ohr Hatorah, Cleveland Heights
Normandy High School, Parma
North Olmsted High School, North Olmsted
North Royalton High School, North Royalton
Olmsted Falls High School, Olmsted Falls
Orange High School, Pepper Pike
Padua Franciscan High School, Parma
Parma Senior High School, Parma
James Ford Rhodes High School, Cleveland
Richmond Heights High School, Richmond Heights
Rocky River High School, Rocky River
St. Edward High School, Lakewood
St. Ignatius High School, Cleveland
St. Joseph Academy, Cleveland
St. Martin de Porres High School, Cleveland
St. Peter Chanel High School, Bedford
Shaker Heights High School, Shaker Heights
Shaw High School, East Cleveland
Solon High School, Solon
South High School, Cleveland
Strongsville High School, Strongsville
Trinity High School, Garfield Heights
University School, Hunting Valley
Valley Forge High School, Parma Heights
Villa Angela-St. Joseph High School, Cleveland
Warrensville Heights High School, Warrensville Heights
Westlake High School, Westlake
Whitney M. Young High School, Cleveland
Yeshiva High School, Beachwood

Darke County
Ansonia High School, Ansonia
Arcanum High School, Arcanum
Franklin Monroe High School, Pitsburg
Greenville High School, Greenville
Mississinawa Valley High School, Union City
Tri-Village High School, New Madison
Versailles High School, Versailles

Defiance County
Ayersville High School, Defiance
Defiance High School, Defiance
Fairview High School, Sherwood
Hicksville High School, Hicksville
Tinora High School, Defiance

Delaware County
Big Walnut High School, Sunbury
Buckeye Valley High School, Delaware
Delaware Christian School, Delaware
Olentangy High School, Lewis Center
Olentangy Liberty High School, Powell
Olentangy Orange High School, Lewis Center
Olentangy Berlin High School, Delaware
Rutherford B. Hayes High School, Delaware
Village Academy, Powell
Westerville Central High School, Westerville
Westerville North High School, Westerville
William K. Willis / Scioto River High School, Delaware

Erie County
Edison High School, Milan
Huron High School, Huron
Kelleys Island High School, Kelleys Island
Margaretta High School, Castalia
Perkins High School, Perkins Township (Sandusky)
St. Mary Central Catholic High School, Sandusky
Sandusky High School, Sandusky
Vermilion High School, Vermilion

Fairfield County
Amanda-Clearcreek High School, Amanda
Berne Union High School, Sugar Grove
Bloom-Carroll High School, Carroll
Fairfield Christian Academy, Lancaster
Fairfield Union High School, Lancaster
William V. Fisher Catholic High School, Lancaster
Lancaster High School, Lancaster
Liberty Union High School, Baltimore
Millersport High School, Millersport
Pickerington High School Central, Pickerington
Pickerington High School North, Pickerington
Eastland-Fairfield Career & Technical Schools, Carroll

Fayette County
Miami Trace High School, Washington Court House
Washington High School, Washington Court House

Franklin County
Alum Crest High School, Columbus
Beechcroft High School, Columbus
Bexley High School, Bexley
Bishop Hartley High School, Columbus
Bishop Ready High School, Columbus
Bishop Watterson High School, Columbus
Briggs High School, Columbus
Canal Winchester High School, Canal Winchester
Centennial High School, Columbus
Central Crossing High School, Grove City
Columbus Academy, Gahanna
Columbus Africentric High School, Columbus
Columbus Alternative High School, Columbus
Columbus School for Girls, Columbus
Downtown High School, Columbus
Dublin Coffman High School, Dublin
Dublin Scioto High School, Dublin
Dublin Jerome High School, Dublin (Serves students primarily in Franklin County)
Dublin City Schools Emerald Campus, Dublin
East High School, Columbus
Eastland-Fairfield Career & Technical Schools, Groveport
Eastmoor Academy, Columbus
Fort Hayes Metropolitan Education Center, Columbus
Franklin Heights High School, Columbus
Gahanna Christian Academy, Gahanna
The Graham School, Columbus
Grandview Heights High School, Columbus
Grove City Christian School, Grove City
Grove City High School, Grove City
Groveport Madison High School, Groveport
Hamilton Township High School, Columbus
Harvest Preparatory School, Canal Winchester
Hilliard Bradley High School, Hilliard
Hilliard Darby High School, Hilliard
Hilliard Davidson High School, Hilliard
Horizon Science Academy, Columbus
Independence High School, Columbus
Lincoln High School, Gahanna
Linden-McKinley High School, Columbus
Linworth Alternative Program, Worthington
Madison Christian School, Groveport
Marion-Franklin High School, Columbus
Mason Run High School, Columbus
The Metro School, Columbus
Mifflin High School, Columbus
New Albany High School, New Albany
Northland High School, Columbus
Northside Christian School, Westerville
Ohio State School for the Blind, Columbus
Ohio School for the Deaf, Columbus
Patriot Preparatory Academy, Columbus
Reynoldsburg High School, Reynoldsburg
Saint Charles Preparatory School, Columbus
St. Francis DeSales High School, Columbus
South High School Urban Academy, Columbus
South-Western Career Academy, Grove City
Tree of Life Christian Schools High School, Columbus
Upper Arlington High School, Upper Arlington
Walnut Ridge High School, Columbus
The Wellington School, Columbus
West High School, Columbus
Westerville South High School, Westerville
Westerville Central High School, Westerville
Westerville North High School, Westerville
Westland High School, Galloway
Whetstone High School, Columbus
Whitehall-Yearling High School, Whitehall
Worthington Christian High School, Worthington
Worthington Kilbourne High School, Worthington
Thomas Worthington High School, Worthington

Fulton County
Archbold High School, Archbold
Delta High School, Delta
Evergreen High School, Metamora
Fayette High School, Fayette
Pettisville High School, Pettisville
Swanton High School, Swanton
Wauseon High School, Wauseon

Gallia County
Gallia Academy High School, Gallipolis
River Valley High School, Bidwell
South Gallia High School, Crown City

Geauga County
Berkshire High School, Burton
Cardinal High School, Middlefield
Chardon High School, Chardon
Hawken School, Gates Mills
Kenston High School, Chagrin Falls
Ledgemont High School, Thompson
Newbury High School, Newbury
Notre Dame-Cathedral Latin School, Chardon
West Geauga High School, Chesterland

Greene County
Beavercreek High School, Beavercreek
Bellbrook High School, Bellbrook
Cedarville High School, Cedarville
Fairborn High School, Fairborn
Greeneview High School, Jamestown
Legacy Christian Academy, Xenia
Xenia High School, Xenia
Yellow Springs High School, Yellow Springs

Guernsey County
Buckeye Trail High School, Lore City
Cambridge High School, Cambridge
Meadowbrook High School, Byesville

Hamilton County

Aiken High School, Cincinnati
Anderson High School, Cincinnati
Archbishop McNicholas High School, Cincinnati
Archbishop Moeller High School, Cincinnati
Roger Bacon High School, Saint Bernard
Cincinnati Country Day School, Indian Hill
Cincinnati Hills Christian Academy, Cincinnati
Clark Montessori High School, Cincinnati
Colerain High School, Cincinnati
Dater High School, Cincinnati
Deer Park Junior/Senior High School, Cincinnati
Elder High School, Cincinnati
Finneytown High School, Cincinnati
William Henry Harrison High School, Harrison
Hillcrest Training School, Cincinnati
Hughes STEM High School, Cincinnati
Indian Hill High School, Cincinnati
La Salle High School, Cincinnati
Lockland High School, Lockland
Loveland High School, Loveland
Madeira High School, Cincinnati
Mariemont High School, Cincinnati
McAuley High School, Cincinnati
Miami Valley Christian Academy, Cincinnati
Mother of Mercy High School, Cincinnati
Mount Healthy High School, Cincinnati
Mount Notre Dame High School, Cincinnati
North College Hill High School, North College Hill
Northwest High School, Cincinnati
Norwood High School, Norwood
Oak Hills High School, Cincinnati
Princeton High School, Sharonville
Purcell Marian High School, Cincinnati
Reading High School, Reading
St. Bernard-Elmwood Place High School, St. Bernard
St. Rita School for the Deaf, Cincinnati
St. Ursula Academy, Cincinnati
St. Xavier High School, Cincinnati
The Schilling School for Gifted Children, Cincinnati
School for Creative and Performing Arts, Cincinnati
Seton High School, Cincinnati
Seven Hills School, Cincinnati
Shroder Paideia High School, Cincinnati
Summit Country Day School, Cincinnati
Sycamore High School, Cincinnati
Robert A. Taft Information Technology High School, Cincinnati
Taylor High School, North Bend
Turpin High School, Cincinnati
Ursuline Academy, Cincinnati
Walnut Hills High School, Cincinnati
Western Hills High School, Cincinnati
Winton Woods High School, Cincinnati
Withrow High School, Cincinnati
Woodward High School, Cincinnati
Wyoming High School, Wyoming

Hancock County
Arcadia High School, Arcadia
Arlington High School, Arlington
Cory-Rawson High School, Rawson
Findlay High School, Findlay
Liberty-Benton High School, Findlay
McComb High School, McComb
Riverdale High School, Mt. Blanchard
Van Buren High School, Van Buren
Vanlue High School, Vanlue

Hardin County
Ada High School, Ada
Hardin Northern High School, Dola
Kenton High School, Kenton
Ridgemont High School, Ridgeway
Upper Scioto Valley High School, McGuffey

Harrison County
Harrison Central High School, Cadiz
Conotton Valley High School, Bowerston

Henry County
Holgate High School, Holgate
Liberty Center High School, Liberty Center
Napoleon High School, Napoleon
Patrick Henry High School, Hamler

Highland County
Fairfield Local High School, Leesburg
Hillsboro High School, Hillsboro
Lynchburg-Clay High School, Lynchburg
McClain High School, Greenfield
Whiteoak High School, Mowrystown

Hocking County
Logan High School, Logan

Holmes County
Hiland High School, Berlin
West Holmes High School, Millersburg

Huron County
Monroeville High School, Monroeville
New London High School, New London
Norwalk High School, Norwalk
St. Paul High School, Norwalk
South Central High School, Greenwich
Western Reserve High School,  Collins
Willard High School, Willard

Jackson County
Jackson High School, Jackson
Oak Hill High School, Oak Hill
Wellston High School, Wellston

Jefferson County
Buckeye Local High School, Rayland
Catholic Central High School, Steubenville
Edison High School, Richmond
Indian Creek High School, Wintersville
Jefferson County Christian School, Wintersville
Steubenville High School, Steubenville
Toronto High School, Toronto

Knox County
Centerburg High School, Centerburg
Danville High School, Danville
East Knox High School, Howard
Fredericktown High School, Fredericktown
Mount Vernon Academy, Mount Vernon
Mount Vernon High School, Mount Vernon

Lake County
Andrews Osborne Academy, Willoughby
Cornerstone Christian Academy, Willoughby
Fairport Harding High School, Fairport Harbor
iSTEM Early College High School, Painsville
Thomas W. Harvey High School, Painesville
Kirtland High School, Kirtland
Lake Catholic High School, Mentor
Madison High School, Madison
Mentor High School, Mentor
North High School, Eastlake
Perry High School, Perry
Riverside High School, Painesville
South High School, Willoughby
Telshe High School, Wickliffe
Wickliffe High School, Wickliffe

Lawrence County
Chesapeake High School, Chesapeake
Collins Career Center, Chesapeake
Dawson-Bryant High School, Coal Grove
Fairland High School, Proctorville
Ironton High School, Ironton
Rock Hill Senior High School, Pedro
Saint Joseph Central High School, Ironton
South Point High School, South Point
Sugar Creek Christian Academy, Ironton
Symmes Valley High School, Willow Wood

Licking County
Career and Technology Education Centers of Licking County, Newark
Granville High School, Granville
Heath High School, Heath
Johnstown-Monroe High School, Johnstown
Lakewood High School, Hebron
Licking Heights High School, Pataskala
Licking Valley High School, Newark
Newark Catholic High School, Newark
Newark High School, Newark
Northridge High School, Johnstown
Utica High School, Utica
Watkins Memorial High School, Pataskala

Logan County
Bellefontaine High School, Bellefontaine
Indian Lake High School, Lewistown
Benjamin Logan High School, Bellefontaine
Riverside High School, De Graff

Lorain County
Avon High School, Avon
Avon Lake High School, Avon Lake
Brookside High School, Sheffield Village
Clearview High School, Lorain
Columbia High School, Columbia Station
Elyria Catholic High School, Elyria
Elyria High School, Elyria
Firelands High School, Oberlin
First Baptist Christian School, Elyria
Ginn Academy, Cleveland
Keystone High School, LaGrange
Lake Ridge Academy, North Ridgeville
Lorain High School, Lorain
Marion L. Steele High School, Amherst
Midview High School, Grafton
North Ridgeville High School, North Ridgeville
Oberlin High School, Oberlin
Open Door Christian School, Elyria
Wellington High School, Wellington

Lucas County
Anthony Wayne High School, Whitehouse
Bowsher High School, Toledo
Cardinal Stritch Catholic High School, Oregon
Central Catholic High School, Toledo
Clay High School, Oregon
Emmanuel Christian School, Toledo
Maumee High School, Maumee
Maumee Valley Country Day School, Toledo
Monclova Christian Academy, Monclova
Notre Dame Academy, Toledo
Ottawa Hills High School, Ottawa Hills
Rogers High School, Toledo
St. Francis de Sales High School, Toledo
St. John's Jesuit High School and Academy, Toledo
St. Ursula Academy, Toledo
Scott High School, Toledo
Springfield Local High School, Holland
Start High School, Toledo
Sylvania Northview High School, Sylvania
Sylvania Southview High School, Sylvania
Toledo Christian Schools, Toledo
Toledo Early College High School, Toledo
Toledo Islamic Academy, Sylvania
Toledo School for the Arts, Toledo
Toledo Technology Academy, Toledo
Waite High School, Toledo
Whitmer High School, Toledo
Woodward High School, Toledo

Madison County
Jonathan Alder High School, Plain City
London High School, London
Madison-Plains High School, London
West Jefferson High School, West Jefferson
Tolles Technical and Career Center, Plain City

Mahoning County
Austintown Fitch High School, Austintown
Boardman High School, Boardman
Campbell Memorial High School, Campbell
Canfield High School, Canfield
Cardinal Mooney High School, Youngstown
Chaney High School, Youngstown
East High School, Youngstown
Jackson-Milton High School, North Jackson
Lowellville High School, Lowellville
McKinley High School, Sebring
Poland Seminary High School, Poland
South Range High School, Canfield
Springfield High School, New Middletown
Struthers High School, Struthers
Ursuline High School, Youngstown
Valley Christian School, Youngstown
West Branch High School, Beloit
Western Reserve High School, Berlin Center

Marion County
Elgin High School, Marion
Marion Harding High School, Marion
Pleasant High School, Marion
Ridgedale High School, Morral
River Valley High School, Caledonia

Medina County
Brunswick High School, Brunswick
Buckeye High School, Medina
Cloverleaf High School, Lodi
Highland High School, Medina
Medina High School, Medina
Medina County Career Center, Medina
Wadsworth High School, Wadsworth

Meigs County
Eastern High School, Reedsville
Meigs High School, Pomeroy
Southern High School, Racine

Mercer County
Celina High School, Celina
Coldwater High School, Coldwater
Fort Recovery High School, Fort Recovery
Marion Local High School, Maria Stein
Parkway High School, Rockford
St. Henry High School, St. Henry

Miami County
Bethel High School, Tipp City
Bradford High School, Bradford
Covington High School, Covington
Miami East High School, Casstown
Milton-Union High School, West Milton
Newton High School, Pleasant Hill
Piqua High School, Piqua
Tippecanoe High School, Tipp City
Troy Christian High School, Troy
Troy High School, Troy

Monroe County
Beallsville High School, Beallsville
Monroe Central High School, Woodsfield
River High School, Hannibal

Montgomery County
Archbishop Alter High School, Kettering
Arise Academy, Dayton
Belmont High School, Dayton
Brookville High School, Brookville
Butler High School, Vandalia
Carroll High School, Dayton
Centerville High School, Centerville
Chaminade-Julienne High School, Dayton
Colin Powell Leadership Academy, Dayton
Dayton Christian High School, Miamisburg
Dayton Early College Academy, Dayton
David H. Ponitz Career Technology Center, Dayton
Dixie High School, New Lebanon
Dominion Academy of Dayton, Dayton
Dunbar High School, Dayton
Horizon Science Academy, Dayton
Jefferson High School, Dayton
Kettering Fairmont High School, Kettering
Meadowdale High School, Dayton
Miami Valley Career Technology Center, Clayton
The Miami Valley School, Dayton
Miamisburg High School, Miamisburg
Northmont High School, Clayton
Northridge High School, Dayton
Oakwood High School, Dayton
Stebbins High School, Dayton
Stivers School for the Arts, Dayton
Temple Christian School, Dayton
Thurgood Marshall High School, Dayton
Trotwood-Madison High School, Trotwood
Valley View High School, Germantown
Wayne High School, Huber Heights
West Carrollton High School, West Carrollton

Morgan County
Morgan High School, McConnelsville

Morrow County
Cardington-Lincoln High School, Cardington
Highland High School, Sparta
Mount Gilead High School, Mount Gilead
Northmor High School, Galion

Muskingum County
Bishop Rosecrans High School, Zanesville
John Glenn High School, New Concord
Maysville High School, Zanesville
Philo High School, Philo
Tri-Valley High School, Dresden
West Muskingum High School, Zanesville
Zanesville High School, Zanesville

Noble County
Caldwell High School, Caldwell
Shenandoah High School, Sarahsville

Ottawa County
Danbury High School, Lakeside
Genoa Area High School, Genoa
Oak Harbor High School, Oak Harbor
Port Clinton High School, Port Clinton
Put-in-Bay High School, Put-in-Bay
Woodmore High School, Elmore

Paulding County
Antwerp High School, Antwerp
Paulding High School, Paulding
Wayne Trace High School, Haviland

Perry County
Crooksville High School, Crooksville
Miller High School, Corning
New Lexington High School, New Lexington
Sheridan High School, Thornville

Pickaway County
Circleville High School, Circleville
Logan Elm High School, Circleville
New Hope Christian Academy, Circleville
Ralph C. Starkey High School, Circleville
Teays Valley High School, Ashville
Westfall High School, Williamsport

Pike County
Eastern High School, Beaver
Piketon High School, Piketon
Waverly High School, Waverly
Western High School, Latham
Pike Christian Academy, Waverly, Ohio

Portage County
Aurora High School, Aurora
Crestwood High School, Mantua
Field High School, Brimfield
James A. Garfield High School, Garrettsville
Ravenna High School, Ravenna
Theodore Roosevelt High School, Kent
Rootstown High School, Rootstown
Southeast High School, Palmyra
Streetsboro High School, Streetsboro
Waterloo High School, Atwater
Windham High School, Windham

Preble County
Eaton High School, Eaton
National Trail High School, New Paris
Preble Shawnee High School, Camden
Tri-County North High School, Lewisburg
Twin Valley South High School, West Alexandria

Putnam County
Columbus Grove High School, Columbus Grove
Continental High School, Continental
Fort Jennings High School, Fort Jennings
Kalida High School, Kalida
Leipsic High School, Leipsic
Miller City High School, Miller City
Ottawa-Glandorf High School, Ottawa
Ottoville High School, Ottoville
Pandora-Gilboa High School, Pandora

Richland County
Clear Fork High School, Bellville
Crestview High School, Ashland
Lexington High School, Lexington
Lucas High School, Lucas
Madison Comprehensive High School, Mansfield
Mansfield Christian High School, Mansfield
Mansfield Senior High School, Mansfield
Ontario High School, Ontario
Pioneer Career and Technology Center, Shelby
Plymouth High School, Plymouth
St. Peter's High School, Mansfield
Shelby High School, Shelby

Ross County
Adena High School, Frankfort
Chillicothe High School, Chillicothe
Huntington High School, Huntington Township
Paint Valley High School, Bainbridge
Southeastern High School, Chillicothe
Unioto High School, Chillicothe
Zane Trace High School, Chillicothe

Sandusky County
Bellevue High School, Bellevue
Clyde High School, Clyde
Fremont Ross High School, Fremont
Gibsonburg High School, Gibsonburg
Lakota High School, Kansas
Saint Joseph Central Catholic High School, Fremont

Scioto County
Clay High School, Portsmouth
Glenwood High School, New Boston
Green High School, Franklin Furnace
Minford High School, Minford
Notre Dame High School, Portsmouth
Portsmouth High School, Portsmouth
Portsmouth West High School, West Portsmouth
Sciotoville Community School, Sciotoville
South Webster High School, South Webster
Valley High School, Lucasville
Wheelersburg High School, Wheelersburg

Seneca County
Bridges Community Academy, Tiffin
Calvert High School, Tiffin
Columbian High School, Tiffin
Hopewell-Loudon High School, Bascom
New Riegel High School, New Riegel
Old Fort High School, Old Fort
Seneca East High School, Attica

Shelby County
Anna High School, Anna
Botkins High School, Botkins
Fairlawn High School, Sidney
Fort Loramie High School, Fort Loramie
Houston High School, Houston
Jackson Center High School, Jackson Center
Lehman Catholic High School, Sidney
Russia High School, Russia
Sidney High School, Sidney

Stark County
Alliance High School, Alliance
Canton South High School, Canton
Central Catholic High School, Canton
East Canton High School, East Canton
Fairless High School, Navarre
GlenOak High School, Plain Township
Heritage Christian School, Canton
Hoover High School, North Canton
Indian River High School, Massillon
Jackson High School, Jackson Township
Lake Center Christian School, Lake Township
Lake Middle/High School, Lake Township
Louisville High School, Louisville
Marlington High School, Alliance
Massillon Christian School, Massillon
McKinley High School, Canton
Minerva High School, Minerva
Northwest High School, Lawrence Township
Perry High School, Perry Township
St. Thomas Aquinas High School, Louisville
Sandy Valley High School, Magnolia
Timken High School, Canton
Tuslaw High School, Massillon
Washington High School, Massillon

Summit County
Archbishop Hoban High School, Akron
Barberton High School, Barberton
Buchtel High School, Akron
Copley High School, Copley
Coventry High School, Coventry Township
Cuyahoga Falls High School, Cuyahoga Falls
Cuyahoga Valley Christian Academy, Cuyahoga Falls
East Community Learning Center, Akron
Ellet High School, Akron
Firestone High School, Akron
Garfield High School, Akron
Green High School, Green
Hametown Christian Academy, Norton 
Hudson High School, Hudson
Kenmore High School, Akron
Manchester High School, New Franklin
Mogadore High School, Mogadore
Nordonia High School, Macedonia
North High School, Akron
Norton High School, Norton
Our Lady of the Elms High School, Akron
Revere High School, Richfield
St. Vincent – St. Mary High School, Akron
Springfield High School, Lakemore
NIHF STEM High School, Akron
Stow-Munroe Falls High School, Stow
Tallmadge High School, Tallmadge
Twinsburg High School, Twinsburg
Walsh Jesuit High School, Cuyahoga Falls
Western Reserve Academy, Hudson
Woodridge High School, Peninsula

Trumbull County
Badger High School, Kinsman
Bloomfield High School, North Bloomfield
Bristol High School, Bristolville
Brookfield High School, Brookfield
Chalker High School, Southington
Champion High School, Warren
Girard High School, Girard
Howland High School, Howland Township
Hubbard High School, Hubbard
John F. Kennedy High School, Warren
LaBrae High School, Leavittsburg
Lakeview High School, Cortland
Liberty High School, Liberty Township
Lordstown High School, Warren
Maplewood High School, Cortland
Mathews High School, Vienna
McDonald High School, McDonald
McKinley High School, Niles
Mineral Ridge High School, Mineral Ridge
Newton Falls High School, Newton Falls
Warren G. Harding High School, Warren

Tuscarawas County
Claymont High School, Uhrichsville
Dover High School, Dover
Garaway High School, Sugarcreek
Indian Valley High School, Gnadenhutten
New Philadelphia High School, New Philadelphia
Newcomerstown High School, Newcomerstown
Strasburg-Franklin High School, Strasburg
Tuscarawas Central Catholic High School, New Philadelphia
Tuscarawas Valley High School, Zoarville

Union County
Dublin Jerome High School, Dublin (Serves mostly Franklin County students.)
Fairbanks High School, Milford Center
Marysville High School, Marysville
North Union High School, Richwood

Van Wert County
Crestview High School, Convoy
Jefferson High School, Delphos
Lincolnview High School, Van Wert
Van Wert High School, Van Wert

Vinton County
Vinton County High School, McArthur

Warren County
Bishop Fenwick High School, Franklin
Carlisle High School, Carlisle
Franklin High School, Franklin
Kings High School, Kings Mills
Lebanon High School, Lebanon
Little Miami High School, Morrow
Springboro High School, Springboro
Waynesville High School, Waynesville
William Mason High School, Mason

Washington County
Belpre High School, Belpre
Fort Frye High School, Beverly
Frontier High School, New Matamoras
Marietta High School, Marietta
Warren Local High School, Vincent
Waterford High School, Waterford

Wayne County
Central Christian High School, Kidron
Chippewa High School, Doylestown
Dalton High School, Dalton
Kingsway Christian School, Orrville
Northwestern High School, West Salem
Norwayne High School, Creston
Orrville High School, Orrville
Rittman High School, Rittman
Smithville High School, Smithville
Triway High School, Wooster
Waynedale High School, Apple Creek
Wooster High School, Wooster

Williams County
Bryan High School, Bryan
Edgerton High School, Edgerton
Edon High School, Edon
Hilltop High School, West Unity
Montpelier High School, Montpelier
North Central High School, Pioneer
Stryker High School, Stryker

Wood County
Bowling Green High School, Bowling Green
Eastwood High School, Pemberville
Elmwood High School, Bloomdale
Fostoria High School, Fostoria
Lake High School, Millbury
North Baltimore High School, North Baltimore
Northwood High School, Northwood
Otsego High School, Tontogany
Perrysburg High School, Perrysburg
Rossford High School, Rossford

Wyandot County
Carey High School, Carey
Mohawk High School, Sycamore
Upper Sandusky High School, Upper Sandusky

See also 
List of school districts in Ohio

External links 
List of high schools in Ohio from SchoolTree.org

 
Ohio
High schools